For the footballer with the same name see George Ley

George Ley was Dean of Cork from 1605 to 1628.

Ley was educated at Trinity College, Dublin.  He had previously been Archdeacon of Down.

Notes

Deans of Cork
17th-century Irish Anglican priests
Archdeacons of Down